During the early 1900s George S. Sandstrom, of Oakland, California, made what is called a Banjo ukulele, or banjolele.  A combination of a ukulele and a banjo, which at the time sold for about $2.00.

Patent and construction 
On December 12, 1917 George Sandstrom of Oakland California filed patent application number 206746. He was awarded patent number 1354268, titled "Banjo," on September 28, 1920.

The patent specifications describe George Sandstrom's invention, in part, as "...a tightening device for banjo heads and other musical instruments having an open circular rim, a flexible head interposed within the opening of the said rim, an annular lip integral therewith and extending inwardly from the top of said rim, a flat top ring fixedly to the inside circumference of the said rim over which said head is drawn.

The George S. Sandstrom banjolele pictured on the right was made in 1917.  It has a bright and surprisingly loud sound.  I purchased it from Griffin Stringed Instruments in Palo Alto California.

Specs. 
 Length:     20"
 Body Dia:   7"
 Body depth: 2"

Materials 
George Sandstrom's instruments had light California Maple necks with a medium dark California maple body. A few were made with the body, and resonator of burled California Redwood.  A true California native.

References 

American musical instrument makers
Year of birth missing
Year of death missing